Keion White (born January 20, 1999) is an American football defensive end. He played college football at Old Dominion before transferring to Georgia Tech in 2021.

Early life and high school
White grew up in Raleigh, North Carolina and attended Garner Magnet High School, where he was a starter at tight end and defensive end on the football team. He was named first team All-Greater Neuse River Conference as a senior after catching 20 catches for 243 yards and four touchdowns. White was rated a three-star recruit and committed to play college football at Old Dominion over offers from Elon, Norfolk State, North Carolina A&T, and Virginia State.

College career
White began his college career playing for the Old Dominion Monarchs, where he initially played tight end. After redshirting his true freshman season, he started eight games and caught 11 passes for 124 yards as a redshirt freshman. White moved to defensive end entering his redshirt sophomore season. In his first season on defense, he made 62 tackles with 3.5 sacks and 19 tackles for loss and was named Second-team All-Conference USA. White opted out of his redshirt junior season in 2020 due to the COVID-19 pandemic and eventually entered the NCAA transfer portal.

White ultimately transferred to Georgia Tech. He broke his ankle playing in a pick-up basketball game prior to his transfer and missed the first eight games of the 2021 season. White played in the final four games of the Yellow Jackets' season and recorded four tackles. White used the extra year of eligibility granted to college athletes in 2020 due to the COVID-19 pandemic and returned to Georgia Tech for the 2022 season.

References

External links
 Georgia Tech Yellow Jackets bio
 Old Dominion Monarchs bio

Living people
American football defensive ends
Players of American football from North Carolina
Georgia Tech Yellow Jackets football players
Old Dominion Monarchs football players
1999 births